Bay-Khaak (Bay-Xaak) is a rural locality (a selo) and the administrative center of Tandinsky District of Tuva, Russia. Population:

References

Notes

Sources

Rural localities in Tuva